Invergarry is a village in the Highlands of Scotland. It is in the Great Glen, near where the River Garry flows into Loch Oich.

Geography
Near the centre of the village is the junction between the A82 road (from Inverness to Fort William) and the A87 road which branches off to the west towards Skye. The ruined Invergarry Castle is situated near the village on Creagan an Fhithich (the Raven's Rock), overlooking Loch Oich. As well as playing host to the local shinty club, Glengarry Shinty Club, it is the home town of shinty player, James Clark.

School
It has a primary school with a roll of 33.

See also
 Invergarry railway station

References

Populated places in Lochaber